Magical Words is a Canadian dramatic short film, directed by Jean-Marc Vallée and released in 1998. A thematic sequel to his 1995 short film Magical Flowers (Les Mots magiques), the film centres on a 30-year-old man (Richard Robitaille) finally confronting his father (Robert Gravel) about his alcoholism.

The film won the Prix Jutra for Best Short Film at the 1st Jutra Awards.

References

External links
 

1998 films
1998 drama films
1998 short films
Films directed by Jean-Marc Vallée
French-language Canadian films
Canadian drama short films
1990s Canadian films